Lee June-hee (born 1 June 1988) is a South Korean footballer who plays for Ansan Greeners as a midfielder.

External links 

1988 births
Living people
South Korean footballers
Association football fullbacks
Daegu FC players
Gyeongnam FC players
Seoul E-Land FC players
Busan IPark players
Ansan Greeners FC players
K League 1 players
K League 2 players